Tugaya is one of the 31 barangays of Valencia City, Bukidnon.
It is bounded by Mount Nebo in the northwest, Lurogan in the north,
Barobo in the east, and Guinoyuran in the south.

References

Barangays of Valencia, Bukidnon